Mehr Caravanserai (Persian: کاروانسرای مهر) is a historical caravanserai belonging to Qajar era in Mehr, Razavi Khorasan province, Iran.

It was listed among the national heritage sites of Iran with the number 1660 on 16 September 1984.

References 

Caravanserais in Iran
Tourist attractions in Razavi Khorasan Province